Colonel Charles Robert Ray (September 14, 1938 – January 18, 1982) was an American officer of the US Army who was murdered on January 18, 1982, in Paris by a Lebanese communist militant affiliated with the Lebanese Armed Revolutionary Faction while serving as an assistant military attaché.

A 35-year-old Lebanese man, Georges Ibrahim Abdallah, was accused of shooting and killing Ray outside his Paris apartment on the morning of 18 January 1982. The Lebanese Armed Revolutionary Faction claimed responsibility for the murder. Ray was shot in the head at point-blank range at about 9 AM as he was walking to his car, which was parked about 100 yards from his apartment. The earliest reports simply indicated that a lone armed man shot Ray at close range in the head with a pistol.

Personal 
Ray was born in New York City on September 14, 1938. He was commissioned in the U.S. Army in 1960. Ray had been stationed in Paris as the Assistant Army Attaché for 18 months. He was a distinguished military intelligence officer, a decorated Vietnam veteran, and on his first assignment as a military attaché. He was married and had two children. Prior to this assignment he resided in Northern Virginia. He was an active parishioner at St. Bernadette's Roman Catholic Church in Springfield, VA, and was responsible for coordinating the altar servers.

Funeral 

A state funeral was held for Lieutenant Colonel Ray at Notre Dame Cathedral in Paris, where he and his family had attended Mass since they first arrived in Paris in 1980. Following the Mass, Ray's body was flown back to the U.S. for a service at St. Bernadette's. Ray was interred at Arlington National Cemetery.

Presidential recognition 
President Ronald Reagan promoted Ray to Colonel posthumously on 3 June 1982. The President approved the promotion and met with Ray's wife during a visit to Paris in June 1982.
U.S. President Ronald Reagan issued the following statement on the death of Colonel Ray:Lieutenant Colonel Charles R. Ray, our Assistant Army Attaché in Paris, was a distinguished career officer. He gave his life in the line of duty as surely as if he had fallen in battle. Our hearts go out to his family in their bereavement, and the wanton act of his murderers reinforces our determination to stamp out international terrorism and prevent similar tragedies in the future.

Prosecution 
Abdallah (aka Salih al-Masri and Abdu-Qadir Saadi) (fr) was captured in 1984 and was sentenced to life in prison in February 1987 for his involvement in the murder. He is currently imprisoned in France.

References

1938 births
1982 deaths
United States Army personnel of the Vietnam War
Assassinated American people
Burials at Arlington National Cemetery
United States Army colonels
People of the Defense Intelligence Agency
Assassinated military personnel
Assassinated American diplomats
American military personnel killed in action
1982 murders in France
United States military attachés